The Centre Dürrenmatt Neuchâtel (CDN) exhibits Friedrich Dürrenmatt's paintings and drawings. It is a part of Swiss National Library, just like Swiss Literary Archives, which has a close cooperation with CDN.

The Centre Dürrenmatt, which was opened in the September 2000 above Neuchâtel, is located in the first Dürrenmatt's residential place in 1952. The Swiss architect Mario Botta was assigned to rebuild the house.

As a place for discussion and research, CDN supports critical debates about Dürrenmatt's artistic and literary works. Beside the temporary exhibition, the permanent exhibition "Friedrich Dürrenmatt, writer and painter" is open for public visit. Readings, concerts, colloquiums and debates take place regularly in the CDN. Apart from numerous exhibits of his literary works (manuscript drafts and notes) and rare exhibited paintings, the CDN offers a wide view over the Lake Neuchâtel and also the Bernese Alps.

History 
In 1952, Friedrich Dürrenmatt moved to his house in the upper part of the city, where he lived and worked until his death on 14 December 1990 (later in another building in that district). He took his life beyond the Röstigraben as a theme in one of his works, especially the reality that he lived in the francophone part of Switzerland since 1952, but he wrote in German language. After his death, his former house was adapted and expanded for being used as a museum. The museum was opened officially in September 2000.

Previous exhibitions 

 Friedrich Dürrenmatt, Writer and Painter, permanent exhibition
 Friedrich Dürrenmatt : Endspiele, from 6 April until 26 October 2003
 Dieter Roth : la Bibliothèque, from 6 April until 26 October 2003
 The Theater of Friedrich Dürrenmatt in Bulgaria, from 7 May until 20 August 2004
 Gotthelf-Dürrenmatt or the Moral in Emmental, from 31 October 2004 until 30 January 2005
 Varlin – Dürrenmatt Horizontal, from 24 April until 31 July 2005
 Hanny Fries : Dürrenmatt in Schauspielhaus Zürich, from 17 September until 17 December 2006
 Dürrenmatt and the Myths: Drawings and Manuscripts, from 11 February until 30 April 2007
 On the border of language, from 19 May until 2 September 2007
 Pavel Schmidt – f.k – Kafka's drawings, from 19 October 2007 until 10 February 2008
 Topor – Encyclopedia of body, from 16 March 2008 until 11 May 2008
 Paul Flora – Royal dramas, from 18 May 2008 until 31 August 2008
 Prag 1968 – 40 years spring of Prag, from 14 September 2008 until 19 October 2008
 Piranesis Carceri, from 10 December 2008 until 8 February 2009
 Caricatures: Sempé, Bosc, Chaval, Ungerer, from 15 February until 31 May 2009
 Pier Paolo Pasolini. Who I am – Qui je suis, from 14 June until 6 September 2009
 Martial Leiter – Guerres, from 25 September 2009 until 31 January 2010
 Dürrenmatt as Caricaturist: New acquisitions, from 3 February until 16 May 2010

Previous performers 

 Aki Takase
 Alexander von Schlippenbach
 Alice der Kevorkian
 Anna Trauffer
 Béatrice Graf
 Benoît Moreau
 Christy Doran
 Claude Berset
 Colin Vallon
 Daniel Humair
 Delphine Bardin
 Franziska Baumann
 Frances-Marie Uitti
 Fredy Studer
 Fritz Hauser
 Hildegard Kleeb
 Jacques Demierre
 Joëlle Léandre
 Jonas Kocher
 Katharina Weber
 Lauren Newton
 Léon Francioli
 Lionel Friedli
 Lucien Dubuis
 Marilyn Crispell
 Martin Schütz
 Mireille Bellenot
 Niklaus Luginbühl
 Nouvel Ensemble Contemporain
 Paul Lovens
 Pauline Oliveros
 Pierre Favre
 Roman Nowka
 Samuel Blaser
 Sylvie Courvoisier
 Urs Leimgruber
 Walther Fähndrich

References

External links 
 
 Website of the Swiss National Library

Friedrich Dürrenmatt
Art museums and galleries in Switzerland
Museums in the canton of Neuchâtel
Art museums established in 2000
2000 establishments in Switzerland
Mario Botta buildings